Izack Rodda (born 20 August 1996) is an Australian professional rugby union player. He currently plays for the Western Force in Super Rugby. Rodda previously played for the Queensland Reds and French Top 14 team Lyon OU. He is capped for the Australian national team and played at the Rugby World Cup in 2019. His regular position is lock.

Family and early life
Izack Rodda was born in Lismore in Northern New South Wales, around 40 kilometres north of his home town of Evans Head. He started playing junior rugby union on the Far North Coast for the Ballina Seahorses RUFC. Rodda was selected for NSW Country junior teams, and also played some rugby league in his early years as a lock forward or prop.

The young Rodda switched his focus to playing rugby union at the age of thirteen, initially as a number eight but later at lock as he grew in stature. He attended Ipswich Grammar in Queensland for his final two years of high school and was selected for the Australian Schoolboys rugby team in 2014.

Rugby career
Rodda joined the Easts Tigers club in Brisbane to play Queensland Premier Rugby, and he represented the Queensland Under-20 team in 2015 and 2016. He signed a train-on contract with the Queensland Reds in 2016, and played in the National Rugby Championship that year for  where former All Blacks test lock Brad Thorn coached the forwards squad.

In 2017, he made his Super Rugby debut for the Reds in the opening round of the season, playing South African team the Sharks in Brisbane, as a substitute for Rob Simmons in the final 18 minutes of a 28–26 win. He played his first match as a starter for the Reds in Brisbane two weeks later against New Zealand side the Crusaders in a narrow 20–22 loss.

Rodda was selected for the Wallabies squad by national coach Michael Cheika in the lead up to The Rugby Championship series of 2017. He gained his first Test cap for Australia in the final stages of the second Bledisloe Cup match of 2017, in a close 35–29 loss to New Zealand at Dunedin.

In June 2020, Rodda signed with French Top 14 side LOU on a one-year contract.  Rodda had previously left the Reds following a refusal to take a pay cut in May 2020.

He returned to Australia in 2021 to join the Western Force.

Super Rugby statistics
:

References

External links
 

Australia international rugby union players
Australian rugby union players
Living people
1996 births
People from Lismore, New South Wales
Queensland Country (NRC team) players
Rugby union locks
Queensland Reds players
Lyon OU players
Western Force players
Rugby union players from New South Wales